Atletico Vega Real is a Dominican professional football team based in La Vega, Dominican Republic, founded in 2014. The team play in the Liga Dominicana de Fútbol.

Current squad

2021-22

Staff
  Nahuel Bernabei – Head coach

Stadium

Estadio Olímpico (La Vega): 2014–

References

External links
 Twitter

Football clubs in the Dominican Republic
Association football clubs established in 2014
2014 establishments in the Dominican Republic
La Vega, Dominican Republic